SNAB (an acronym in Dutch: Stichting Noordhollandse Alternatieve Bierbrouwers, North Holland Alternative Beer Brewer's Foundation) is a Dutch organisation dedicated to promoting alternative beer and beer culture in the Netherlands, from Purmerend, North Holland.

Overview 

SNAB was founded on 24 January 1991 to promote what they term alternative beers and beer culture. They explain this as meaning beers which are brewed either with unusual ingredients or by unusual methods. In order to achieve this they work to develop and commercialise types of beer which are relatively unknown in the Netherlands. Specifically, the SNAB lists its goals as:

 The reintroduction of older types of beer which have faded from popularity and the introduction of types of beer which have not previously been brewed in the Netherlands.
 The brewing of beers with their own recognisable taste, with the emphasis on adventurous flavours and taste sensations.
 Pushing the boundaries of brewing through the use of natural, unconventional ingredients and also combining classic styles to create new, alternative beers.

SNAB does not operate its own commercial scale brewery. Instead, recipes are developed using the foundation's own micro brewery but the beers are brewed on a commercial scale under license by the Proefbrouwerij in Lochristie, Belgium.

Products 

Beers produced by SNAB are:

Beers produced all year round

Seasonal beers 
Seasonal beers include:

References

External links
 Official website

Beer in the Netherlands
Beer organizations
1991 establishments in the Netherlands
Organisations based in North Holland
Purmerend